The Jersey-variant British passport is a type of British passport issued in the British Crown dependency of Jersey by the Passport Office in St Helier. 

Jersey-variant British passports are full British passports and are simply an alternative design used by the Jersey passport authorities to distinguish passports issued by the island. As such, they can theoretically be issued to any British citizens, however in practice are only issued to British citizens connected to Jersey.

Eligibility

The Passport Office of the Jersey Government issues British passports only to British citizens living in the Channel Islands, the United Kingdom or the Isle of Man who have a connection to Jerseye.g. were born, or live in Jersey or are a child born outside Jersey to parents born in Jersey.

Applicants cannot be physically abroad at the time of application.

Endorsements

Jersey-variant British passports before 2020 may have an observation included to the following effect:

Under Protocol 3 of the UK's EU accession treaty, some British citizens connected to Jersey had Channel Islander status. Channel Islanders were not able to benefit from free movement rights (of people and services) in the EU outside the UK (they could in Ireland due to Common Travel Area rights).

A Channel Islander was everyone who was a British citizen only because they, their parent or their grandparent was born, adopted, naturalised or registered in Jersey. It did not include British citizens who had a parent or grandparent who was born, adopted, naturalised or registered as a British citizen in the UK. Channel Islanders would lose their status if they lived in the UK for five years. Immigrants to Jersey, including EEA nationals who otherwise had EU citizenship, who naturalised or registered as British citizens in Jersey, as well as anyone who gets British citizenship from them by descent, also had Channel Islander status.

After Brexit, no British citizens were able to exercise freedom of movement rights, so Channel Islander status and the associated passport observation ceased to be used from 1 January 2021.

Design

The design generally follows that of other British passports;  however, like many other British territories and dependencies with separate passport offices, it replaces the text "United Kingdom" with other text.    

Current issue British passports are navy blue, as are Jersey-variant passports.  

The blue passport sports the Royal coat of arms emblazoned in the centre of the front cover. "BRITISH PASSPORT" is inscribed above the coat of arms and "BAILIWICK OF JERSEY" inscribed below. The biometric passport symbol  appears at the bottom of the front cover. The rear cover of blue passports are also embossed with the floral emblems of England (Tudor rose), Northern Ireland (Shamrock), Scotland (Scotch thistle) and Wales (daffodil).

Jersey passports contain on their inside cover the following words in English only:

Prior to 1988, all Jersey-variant British passports were navy blue, like the other British passports. Between 1988 and 2020, they were burgundy and endorsed with the words "EUROPEAN UNION BRITISH ISLANDS". British Islands refers to the collective territory of the United Kingdom and Crown dependencies.

Passports issued after the death of Queen Elizabeth II read "His Majesty", whereas passports issued during Elizabeth II's reign read "Her Majesty".

References

External links

Jersey
British passports
European Union passports
Passport